The following highways are numbered 764:

Canada

United States